Ezerani is a village in the Resen Municipality of North Macedonia, on the northern shore of Lake Prespa.

Demographics
Ezerani has 203 inhabitants as of the most recent census of 2002. Historically populated by ethnic Macedonians, the village has experienced a general population decline over the past several decades.

References

Villages in Resen Municipality